Biangabip Airport  is an airport serving Biangabip, a small locality in the Western Province in Papua New Guinea.

References

External links
 

Airports in Papua New Guinea
Western Province (Papua New Guinea)